Zinc finger BED-type containing 2 is a protein that in humans is encoded by the ZBED2 gene.

References

Further reading

External links 
 PDBe-KB provides an overview of all the structure information available in the PDB for Human Zinc finger BED domain-containing protein 2